The 2010 Nordic Tournament was the fourth edition and took place in Falun, Trondheim and Oslo between 7–14 March 2010.

Results

Overall

References

External links
Official website 

2010 in ski jumping
Nordic Tournament